Geologorazvedka is a rural locality (a settlement) in Solikamsky District, Perm Krai, Russia. The population was 212 as of 2010. There are 4 streets.

Geography 
Geologorazvedka is located 15 km south of Solikamsk (the district's administrative centre) by road. Chashkina is the nearest rural locality.

References 

Rural localities in Solikamsky District